Neobuchia is a monotypic genus of flowering plants belonging to the family Malvaceae. It only contains one known species, Neobuchia paulinae Urb. 

It is native to Haiti section of the island of Hispaniola .

The genus name of Neobuchia is in honour of Wilhelm Buch (1862–1943), a German pharmacist and botanist, and his wife Amalia Pauline Wilhelmine Buch. The Latin specific epithet of paulinae refers to Wilhelm Buch's wife, Amalia Pauline Wilhelmine Buch.
Both the genus and the species were first described and published in I.Urban, Symb. Antill. Vol.3 on page 319 in 1902.

References

Bombacoideae
Malvaceae genera
Plants described in 1902
Flora of Haiti
Flora without expected TNC conservation status